The AI Song Contest 2021 was the second edition of the AI Song Contest, an international music competition for songs that have been composed using artificial intelligence (AI). The contest was co-organised by the technology hubs Wallifornia MusicTech, DeepMusic.ai, and Amsterdam Music Lab. The results of the competition were announced on 6 July 2021 at a virtual conference that was part of the four-day Music & Innovation Summit organised by Wallifornia MusicTech. The contest was won by M.O.G.I.I.7.E.D. from the United States with the song "Listen to Your Body Choir".

Format 
Each participating team had to submit a song of up to four minutes that has been composed using artificial intelligence. Human input was allowed, but the more AI was used, the more points the entry got from the jury. The entries were also evaluated by the public through online voting. The winner was announced in a live show on 6 July 2021.

Jury 
The jury consisted of eight AI experts, who assessed each entry based on the use of artificial intelligence in the songwriting process:

 Ryan Groves (Infinite Album)
 Imogen Heap (singer-songwriter)
 Anna Huang (Google Brain)
 Rujing Stacy Huang (KTH Royal Institute of Technology)
 Ajay Kapur (California Institute of the Arts)
 Hendrik Vincent Koops (RTL Nederland)
 Mark Simos (Berklee College of Music)
 Uncanny Valley (winners of the 2020 edition)

Competing entries 
The live show took place on 6 July 2021 at 18:00 CEST and was broadcast by Wallifornia MusicTech as part of the virtual Music & Innovation Summit. The contest featured the following competing entries:

Notes

References

External links 
 Official website

2021 song contests
Artificial intelligence art
Computer music
Song contests